In quantum mechanics, and especially quantum information and the study of open quantum systems, the trace distance T is a metric on the space of density matrices and gives a measure of the distinguishability between two states. It is the quantum generalization of the Kolmogorov distance for classical probability distributions.

Definition 
This can be thought of as the matrix obtained from  taking the algebraic square roots of its eigenvalues. For the trace distance, we more specifically have an expression of the form  where  is Hermitian. More explicitly,

The factor of two ensures that the trace distance between normalized density matrices takes values in the range .

Connection with the total variation distance 
The trace distance can be seen as a direct quantum generalization of the total variation distance between probability distributions. Given a pair of probability distributions , their total variation distance isAttempting to directly apply this definition to quantum states raises the problem that quantum states can result in different probability distributions depending on how they are measured. A natural choice is then to consider the total variation distance between the classical probability distribution obtained measuring the two states, maximized over the possible choices of measurement, which results precisely in the trace distance between the quantum states. More explicitly, this is the quantitywith the maximization performed with respect to all possible POVMs .

To see why this is the case, we start observing that there is a unique decomposition  with  positive semidefinite matrices with orthogonal support. With these operators we can write concisely . Furthermore , and thus .

Physical interpretation 
By using the Hölder duality for Schatten norms, the trace distance can be written in variational form as 

As for its classical counterpart, the trace distance can be related to the maximum probability of distinguishing between two quantum states:

His expected probability of correctly identifying the incoming state is then given by

Therefore, when applying an optimal measurement, Bob has the maximal probability

of correctly identifying in which state Alice prepared the system.

Properties 
The trace distance has the following properties
 It is a metric on the space of density matrices, i.e. it is non-negative, symmetric, and satisfies the triangle inequality, and 
  and  if and only if  and  have orthogonal supports
 It is preserved under unitary transformations: 
 It is contractive under trace-preserving CP maps, i.e. if  is a CPT map, then 
 It is convex in each of its inputs. E.g. 
 On pure states, it can be expressed uniquely in term of the inner product of the states:  

For qubits, the trace distance is equal to half the Euclidean distance in the Bloch representation.

Relationship to other distance measures

Fidelity 
The fidelity of two quantum states  is related to the trace distance  by the inequalities

Total variation distance 

The trace distance is a generalization of the total variation distance, and for two commuting density matrices, has the same value as the total variation distance of the two corresponding probability distributions.

References 

Quantum information science